The Tosan (sometimes known as  Towsan, meaning "wild horse" or "fury") is an Iranian light tank. Iran calls it a "Quick Reaction" tank because the tank is said to be capable of rapid response and is built for strategic missions.

History
Production started in 1997, but the tank was only produced in small numbers. Colonel Nasser Arab-Beigi, head of the self-sufficiency unit of the IRGC ground forces, announced the mass-production of the Tosan on June 30, 2008, as part of the country's campaign for defense self-sufficiency.

In July 2020, Tosans were deployed to the northwestern borders of Jolfa and Khodaafarin due to escalating tensions between Armenia and Azerbaijan.

Design
The Tosan's design is based on the British FV101 Scorpion; the tank is fitted with a 90 mm gun, Toophan missile launchers (some were mounted), and improved firing and targeting systems. The tank can drive long distances on its tracks and does not need to be carried on trucks.

Iranian sources reported that the Tosan's front armor is armored against bullets up to 12.7 caliber. It is equipped with a diesel engine.

Variants

 Anti-Tank missile carrier, equipped with two Toophan launchers instead of a turret.
 MRLS system.

Operators

 : Used by the Iranian Army and the Islamic Revolutionary Guard Corps.

References

Tracked reconnaissance vehicles
Light tanks of Iran
Post–Cold War light tanks
Military vehicles introduced in the 1990s